Jerdon's bush chat (Saxicola jerdoni) is a species of bird in the family Muscicapidae.

The common name commemorates the surgeon-naturalist Thomas C. Jerdon.

Distribution
The Jerdon's bush chat has an extremely large range and is native to Bangladesh, China, India, Laos, Nepal, Thailand and Vietnam. The species is possibly extinct in Myanmar.

The Sukla Phanta National Park in Nepal represents the western limit of its distribution.

References

External links
 BirdLife International: Jerdon's Bushchat
 Xeno-canto: audio recordings of Jerdon's bush chat

Jerdon's bush chat
Birds of Northeast India
Birds of Laos
Birds of Myanmar
Jerdon's bush chat
Jerdon's bush chat
Taxonomy articles created by Polbot